The Bulletin Building is an historic structure located in the Chinatown neighborhood in Washington, D.C.

History
The architectural firm of Rodier & Kundzin designed the building, constructed in 1928, for the United Publishing Company.  The main façade of the building is constructed in limestone, and features four Art Deco bas relief panels that portray the printing trade and ties the building to the trade, that it housed for 60 years.  

It is currently the home of Bar Deco restaurant.

It was listed on the National Register of Historic Places in 2008.

See also
 National Register of Historic Places listings in central Washington, D.C.

References

External links
 

1928 establishments in Washington, D.C.
Art Deco architecture in Washington, D.C.
Commercial buildings on the National Register of Historic Places in Washington, D.C.
Office buildings completed in 1928